Sebastien Edgar (born 26 May 1991) is a British handball player. He was born in Basildon in Essex, England. He competed for the British national team at the 2012 Summer Olympics in London.

Early life
Edgar moved to France at a young age and spent the majority of his childhood there. He practiced judo before taking up handball.

Handball career
A right-sided player, Edgar played club handball in France with Nimes and Valence. For the 2019/20 season, he competed with Luxembourg-based Handball Käerjeng.

International career
Edgar was a member of Great Britain's 2012 Olympic Handball squad. He scored in a match against Sweden. He remained a part of Team GB's squad, participating in Emerging Nations tournaments and Euro Qualifying.

References

External links

1991 births
Living people
Sportspeople from Basildon
British male handball players
Olympic handball players of Great Britain
Handball players at the 2012 Summer Olympics